Diaphus handi is a species of lanternfish found in the Philippines and the Western Central Pacific Ocean.

Etymology
The fish is named in honor of the H. Walker Hand of Cape May, New Jersey, to whom Fowler was indebted for many fishes from the Cape May area.

References

Myctophidae
Taxa named by Henry Weed Fowler
Fish described in 1934